Paul Franke or Francke may refer to:

 Paul Francke (architect) (died 1615), German Renaissance architect
 Paul Francke (musician) (born 1979), American songwriter and instrumentalist
 Paul Franke (tenor) (1917–2011), American operatic tenor
 Paul Franke (figure skater) (1888–1950), German figure skater

See also
 Paul Frank (born  1967), American cartoonist, artist and fashion designer
 Paul Christian Frank (1879–1956), Norwegian jurist and politician